Never Say Never (2019) was a professional wrestling event produced by Major League Wrestling (MLW), which took place on July 25, 2019, at the Melrose Ballroom in New York, New York. The event was a television taping for future episodes of Fusion on beIN Sports. It was the third event in the Never Say Never chronology. 

Fourteen professional wrestling matches were taped at the event with most of the matches airing on future episodes of Fusion. In the main event, Jacob Fatu successfully defended the World Heavyweight Championship against Tom Lawlor. In other prominent matches on the card, L.A. Park defeated Jimmy Havoc in a New York City Street Fight, Teddy Hart retained the World Middleweight Championship against MJF and Alexander Hammerstone retained the National Openweight Championship against the debuting Savio Vega. The event also featured the MLW debut of Spirit Squad (Kenny and Mikey) as they competed against The Von Erichs (Marshall and Ross) in a losing effort.

Production

Background
In July 2017, Major League Wrestling resumed promoting events for the first time since the promotion's original closure in 2004. The success of these events lead MLW to secure a television deal with beIN Sports for a new program, MLW Fusion, which debuted on April 20, 2018.

On April 9, 2019, it was announced on MLW's website that the third edition of Never Say Never would take place on July 25 at the Melrose Ballroom in New York City.

Storylines
On March 26, it was announced that LA Park would take on Jimmy Havoc in a New York City Street Fight at Battle Riot II. However, Havoc withdrew from the match due to his injury. The match was later set for Never Say Never.

On June 12, it was announced that Austin Aries would be returning to MLW at Never Say Never. It was later announced that Aries would take on Ace Austin at the event.

On June 18, it was announced that Savio Vega would make his MLW debut. Billed as the Caribbean Heavyweight Champion, Vega was supposed to take on Alexander Hammerstone for the latter's National Openweight Championship.

On June 21, it was announced that Timothy Thatcher would be making his MLW debut. It was announced on July 9 that Thatcher would be taking on Davey Boy Smith Jr. in the former's MLW debut at Never Say Never.

On June 30, it was announced that Zenshi would be making his MLW debut at Never Say Never.

At Kings of Colosseum, Jacob Fatu defeated Tom Lawlor to win the World Heavyweight Championship. On July 10, Lawlor invoked his rematch clause against Fatu with the rematch set for Never Say Never.

On July 11, it was announced that Bestia 666 and Rey Horus would compete in a match at Never Say Never.

The ongoing rivalry between The Hart Foundation and The Dynasty continued as it was announced that Teddy Hart would defend the World Middleweight Championship against MJF and Brian Pillman Jr. would take on Richard Holliday.

Results

References

External links
Major League Wrestling official website

2019 in professional wrestling
Major League Wrestling shows
Events in New York City
July 2019 sports events in the United States
2019 in New York City
Professional wrestling in New York City